Gyrodactylus gondae is a species of monogenean ectoparasites. It was found in Pomatoschistus minutus and Pomatoschistus lozanoi in European coastal waters.

See also 
 Gyrodactylus flavescensis
 Gyrodactylus arcuatoides
 Gyrodactylus branchialis

References 

Animals described in 2004
gondae